The Denouncement of Chu Liu Hsiang, alternatively known as Legendary Swordsman or Titanium Blade, is a 1983 Taiwanese film written by Gu Long. The film was directed by Chang Peng-i and starred Adam Cheng as the lead character, Chu Liuxiang.

Cast
Adam Cheng as Chu Liuxiang
Lui Ying-ying as Lin Huanyu
Norman Chui as Murong Qingcheng
Luk Yat-lung as Hu Tiehua
Tin Hok as Liu Shangdi
Luk Yee-fung as Liu Rushi
Chow Ming-hui as Song Tian'er
Chow Shui-fong as Li Hongxiu
Alan Chui Chung-San as Daoba Hou
Yip Hoi-yung
Shih Ting-ken
Fan Mei-Sheng
Wong Chi-Sang
Cheung Yee-Kwai
Su Chen-Ping
Wong Fei-Lung
Ma Cheung
Yeung Yeuk-Laan
Wong Kei
Man Naam-Sai
Siu Wong-Lung
Lam Kai-Man
Ho Hing-Nam
Lee Gam-Shin
Lee Jo-Wing

References

External links

1983 films
Taiwanese martial arts films
Wuxia films
Works based on Chu Liuxiang (novel series)
Films based on works by Gu Long